No Magic, Inc. is a software company that develops solutions in the areas of object oriented design and development. No Magic has been in OMG (Object Management Group) standards based technologies and methods is the area of modeling, simulation and analysis for over 19 years.

History
Established in July 1995, No Magic operates worldwide; software development facilities are located in the EU (Kaunas, Lithuania) and Thailand (Bangkok). No Magic's corporate and sales headquarters are located in Allen, Texas.

In 2002, MagicDraw won the Java Developer's Journal award for "Best Database Tool or Driver" category.

On October 25, 2017, No Magic announced an agreement to be acquired by Dassault Systemes, subject to regulatory approval. The acquisition was completed in 2018.

Products
No Magic's main products include:

Object Oriented Modeling Tools 
 MagicDraw
 Cameo Enterprise Architecture
 Cameo Business Modeler
 Cameo Collaborator

Plugins for MagicDraw
 SysML Plugin
 UPDM2.0 Plugin
 UPDM Plugin
 Cameo Simulation Toolkit
 Cameo Business Modeler Plugin
 Cameo Requestments Modeler Plugin
 ParaMagic Plugin
 Cameo SOA+
 Cameo Pata Modeler
 Cameo NIEM Plugin
 Cameo Merge Plugin
 Cameo Embedded Engineer For MagicDraw

References

Software companies based in Texas
Companies based in Allen, Texas
Defunct software companies of the United States